Run, Rebecca, Run is a 1981 Australian film directed by Peter Maxwell and starring Henri Szeps, Simone Buchanan, and John Ewart.

Premise
The screenplay concerns a child kidnapped by a refugee.

Production
It was shot in Sydney.

References

External links

Run Rebecca Run at Letterbox DVD
Run Rebecca Run at Screen Australia

Australian drama films
1981 films
1980s English-language films
Films directed by Peter Maxwell
1980s Australian films